Lajos Dunai (29 November 1942 – 18 December 2000) was a Hungarian footballer. He was born in Budapest. He competed at the 1968 Summer Olympics in Mexico City, where he won a gold medal with the Hungarian team.

He played for Csillaghegy, III. Kerületi TUE and MTK Budapest and for the Hungary national football team twice.

References

External links
 

 

1942 births
2000 deaths
Footballers from Budapest
Hungarian footballers
Hungary international footballers
MTK Budapest FC players
Olympic footballers of Hungary
Footballers at the 1968 Summer Olympics
Olympic gold medalists for Hungary
Olympic medalists in football
Medalists at the 1968 Summer Olympics
Association football forwards